Reid Hope King is a census-designated place (CDP) in Cameron County, Texas, United States. The population was 786 at the 2010 census. It is part of the Brownsville–Harlingen Metropolitan Statistical Area.

Geography
Reid Hope King is located in southern Cameron County at  (25.919803, -97.412307). Texas State Highway 4 forms the southern edge of the CDP; the highway leads west  to the center of Brownsville and east  to its end at Boca Chica Beach on the Gulf of Mexico.

Demographics
As of the census of 2000, there were 802 people, 194 households, and 174 families residing in the CDP. The population density was 2,710.8 people per square mile (1,032.2/km2). There were 212 housing units at an average density of 716.6/sq mi (272.8/km2). The racial makeup of the CDP was 77.31% White, 1.75% African American, 0.25% Native American, 16.71% from other races, and 3.99% from two or more races. Hispanic or Latino of any race were 95.26% of the population.

There were 194 households, out of which 56.2% had children under the age of 18 living with them, 62.4% were married couples living together, 22.7% had a female householder with no husband present, and 10.3% were non-families. 8.2% of all households were made up of individuals, and 3.1% had someone living alone who was 65 years of age or older. The average household size was 4.13 and the average family size was 4.38.

In the CDP, the population was spread out, with 38.3% under the age of 18, 13.2% from 18 to 24, 23.6% from 25 to 44, 18.3% from 45 to 64, and 6.6% who were 65 years of age or older. The median age was 24 years. For every 100 females, there were 93.7 males. For every 100 females age 18 and over, there were 88.2 males.

The median income for a household in the CDP was $19,732, and the median income for a family was $25,865. Males had a median income of $13,657 versus $12,143 for females. The per capita income for the CDP was $8,845. About 38.8% of families and 41.2% of the population were below the poverty line, including 45.3% of those under age 18 and 54.3% of those age 65 or over.

Education
Reid Hope King is served by the Brownsville Independent School District.

In addition, South Texas Independent School District operates magnet schools that serve the community.

References

Census-designated places in Cameron County, Texas
Census-designated places in Texas